Arlindo Rodrigues (1931 - Rio de Janeiro, 1987) was a celebrated Brazilian carnavalesco. For GRES Mocidade Independente de Padre Miguel in 1974, he presented the plot "A Festa do Divino" ( "The Party of the Divine").

References

1931 births
1987 deaths